Kelli Kuehne Doremus (born May 11, 1977) is a retired American professional golfer.

Amateur career
Kuehne was born in Dallas, Texas. She was the Texas UIL 4A Girls Individual State Champion four years in a row, 1992, 1993, 1994, 1995 while attending Highland Park High School in Dallas, Texas. In 1994 she won the U.S. Girls' Junior. The following year she won the U.S. Women's Amateur and in 1996 repeated as the U.S. Women's Amateur champion while also winning the British Ladies Amateur. She played college golf at the University of Texas where she was an All-American. She played on the 1996 Curtis Cup team.

Professional career
Kuehne turned professional in 1996. She joined the LPGA Tour in 1998. Her only LPGA Tour win came at the 1999 LPGA Corning Classic. She played on the U.S. team in the Solheim Cup in 2002 and 2003.

At the 1999 Jamie Farr Kroger Classic, Kuehne took part in a six-player playoff. It was the biggest in LPGA history. Se Ri Pak birdied the first sudden death playoff hole to defeat Kuehne, Karrie Webb, Carin Koch, Sherri Steinhauer, and Mardi Lunn. Kuehne, who had finished play 90 minutes before the last group finished play, had left the golf course and gone back to her hotel. After getting a call from a LPGA official, Kuenhe raced back to the course just in time to take part in the playoff.

Personal
Two of Kuehne's brothers are also golfers. Trip Kuehne was runner-up to Tiger Woods in the 1994 U.S. Amateur and won the 2007 U.S. Mid-Amateur. Hank Kuehne won the U.S. Amateur in 1998 before turning professional.

Kuehne was diagnosed with diabetes mellitus type 1 when she was ten years old, and started using an insulin pump in 1998.

Amateur wins
1994 U.S. Girls' Junior
1995 U.S. Women's Amateur
1996 U.S. Women's Amateur, British Ladies Amateur

Professional wins

LPGA Tour wins (1)

LPGA Tour playoff record (0–2)

U.S. national team appearances
Amateur
Curtis Cup: 1996
Espirito Santo Trophy: 1996

Professional
Solheim Cup: 2002 (winners), 2003

References

External links

American female golfers
Texas Longhorns women's golfers
LPGA Tour golfers
Winners of ladies' major amateur golf championships
Solheim Cup competitors for the United States
Golfers from Dallas
People with type 1 diabetes
1977 births
Living people